The 1982 Miami Hurricanes football team represented the University of Miami during the 1982 NCAA Division I-A football season. It was the Hurricanes' 57th season of football. The Hurricanes were led by fourth-year head coach Howard Schnellenberger and played their home games at the Orange Bowl. They finished the season 7–4 overall.

Schedule

Roster

Game summaries

Michigan State

at Notre Dame

Team players drafted into the NFL

References

Miami
Miami Hurricanes football seasons
Miami Hurricanes football